The Talwar-class frigates or Project 11356 are a class of stealth guided missile frigates designed and built by Russia for the Indian Navy. The Talwar-class guided missile frigates are the improved versions of the Krivak III-class (Project 1135) frigates used by the Russian Coast Guard. Six ships were built in two batches between 1999 and 2013.

Designed by Severnoye Design Bureau, the first batch of ships were built by Baltic Shipyard and the second batch by Yantar Shipyard.
Preceded by the Brahmaputra-class frigates, the Talwar-class frigates are said to have semi-stealth features and better armament. The Indian Navy currently has six of these ships and 4 more are under construction including 2 in an Indian shipyard, for which Goa shipyard was selected.

History 
On 17 November 1997, Russia and India signed a $1 billion contract, for three Krivak III-class multi-purpose frigates. The Indian Navy wanted to fill the gap created by the decommissioning of the s until the Project 17-class frigates entered service.

After the signing of the contract, Severnoye Design Bureau began a detail design layout and the shipbuilder, Baltisky Zavod of St. Petersburg, began preparations for their construction. The project involved around 130 suppliers from Russia, India, Britain, Germany, Denmark, Belarus, Ukraine and other countries including over 30 St. Petersburg-based naval design organizations and institutes.

The first frigate, INS Talwar was delivered in May 2002. The second, INS Trishul, was delivered in November 2002 and the third, INS Tabar, in May 2003. The Russian firm delayed the delivery of three frigates by 13 months, 7 months and 11 months respectively. The contract stipulated the levy of liquidated damages for the delays and the same worked out to the equivalent of 38.5 million. This was yet to be recovered as of December 2005.

The Government of India signed a follow-on contract for the purchase of three additional frigates on 14 July 2006. These ships will be built at Yantar Shipyard in Kaliningrad. The first frigate was scheduled for delivery in April 2011. These ships will feature BrahMos supersonic anti-ship cruise missile instead of the Klub-N/3M54TE missile system which was provided to the Talwar, Trishul and Tabar frigates.

In July 2012 India Today announced the start of talks about purchasing three additional Talwar-class frigates (No.7 to No.9). In March 2016, it was reported that India and Russia are still negotiating the purchase of the additional ships.

Design and description 
The Severnoye Design Bureau developed the Project 1135.6 vessel using an earlier Project 1135.1 design, which dated back to the early 1980s. The ship's redesigned topside and hull has a considerably reduced radar cross-section. While the superstructure sides are sloped and relatively clean, the very cluttered topside of the ship cannot be remotely described as having any signature reducing features. These frigates will be the first Indian Navy warships to incorporate some stealth features. The ship's hull is characterized by outward flare and tumblehome, while the superstructure (which forms a continuous junction with the hull) has a large fixed tumblehome angle.

Power plant 
The Talwars features the Zorya designed and Mashproekt (Ukraine) manufactured M7N.1E gas turbine plant which comprises two DS-71 cruise turbines and two DT-59 boost turbines in two engine rooms. Two cruising RO63 two-speed gearboxes and one cruising R1063 auxiliary gearbox which makes it possible to use any of the cruising engines to drive both propeller shafts. A boost component with two DT-59.1 gas-turbine engines, each rated at  forward running,  in reverse and two RO58 single-speed reduction gearboxes. The four gas turbines are mounted on isolated cradles which minimize their contact with the hull and thereby considerably reduce the transmission of her vibration and sound.

Electrical power is provided by four 1 MW Wärtsilä WCM-1000 generator sets with Cummins KTA50G3 engines and Kirloskar 1 MV AC generators. The contract for the generators was signed with Wärtsilä Denmark.

Flight deck 
The Talwar class can accommodate one Ka-28 Helix-A antisubmarine helicopter or one Ka-31 Helix-B airborne early warning helicopter which can provide over-the-horizon targeting. The vessel can also embark the navalised variant of the indigenous HAL Dhruv.

Armament 

The frigates are armed with a new 3M-54 Klub anti-ship system with a vertical missile launcher, Shtil-1 multi-channel medium-range surface-to-air missile system (an export version of the SA-N-12 "Grizzly"), a Kashtan anti-aircraft missile and artillery system, a RBU-6000 depth charge launcher and Puma-Universal artillery system. These ships are designed to carry and operate one heavy duty helicopter.

Primary weapon 
In the main strike role, an eight-cell 3S14E vertical missile launcher is fitted, which accommodates the 3M-54E Klub-N anti-ship missile developed by the Novator Design Bureau.

Air defence 
The Shtil-1 SAM system with a 3S-90 missile launcher is fitted forward of the bridge and is armed with the 9M317 (SA-N-12 "Grizzly", navalised SA-17) missile. 24 missiles are carried in a magazine located below deck. Guidance and target illumination for these missiles is provided by four MR-90 Orekh (NATO: Front Dome) radars, which are connected to a command and control post. The  blast-fragmentation warhead is triggered by a radar proximity fuze. The missile's control system and warhead can be adjusted to a specific target following target recognition, which increases hit probability. Eight Igla-1E (SA-16) portable air defence missiles are also carried.

Close-in weapon system (CIWS) 
For the CIWS role, two Kashtan air defence gun and missile systems are used. Each system consists of two GSh-30k (AO-18K) six-barreled 30 mm Gatling guns, fed by a link-less mechanism, and two SA-N-11 (navalised variant of the 9M311, SA-19) SAM clusters. The system also includes a storing and reloading system to keep 32 SAMs in container-launchers in the vessel's under-deck spaces. The follow-on order ships Teg, Tarkash and Trikand were fitted with the AK-630 system, replacing the Kashtan system in the earlier ships.

Main gun 
One 100 mm A-190(E) gun is fitted forward for use against ship and shore based targets The A-190(E) uses a lightweight gun mount with an automatic gun and fuze setter. Fire control is provided by the 5P-10E Puma FCS.

The gun features higher automation of fire preparation and control and employs advanced guided and rocket-assisted long-range and enhanced-lethality projectiles fitted with dual-mode impact/proximity fuzes. Together with the use of the muzzle velocity meter, it is designed to produce increased combat capability. In addition, the gun turret features stealth technology to minimize the radar signature of a ship.

Anti-submarine warfare 
The ships carry the RPK-8 system, which uses a 12 barreled RBU-6000 ASW rocket launcher to fire the 212 mm 90R anti-submarine rocket or RGB-60 depth charges.

Two twin 533 mm DTA-53-11356 fixed torpedo tube launchers are fitted amidships and fire the SET-65E/53-65KE torpedoes. The Purga anti-submarine fire-control system provides control for both the RBU-6000 and DTA-53 launchers.

Electronics and sensors

Radar 
Surface search: One 3Ts-25E Garpun-B radar at I-band frequency, using both active and passive channels, provides long-range surface target designation. One MR-212/201-1 radar at I-band frequency is used for navigation and a separate Kelvin Hughes Nucleus-2 6000A radar set is used for short-range navigation and surface surveillance. Also fitted with a Ladoga-ME-11356 inertial navigation and stabilisation suite supplied by Elektropribor.
Air/surface search: One Fregat M2EM (NATO: Top Plate) 3D circular scan radar at E-band frequency, provides target indication to the Shtil-1 missile system. Featuring continuous electronically scanned arrays, the radar rotates at 12 or 6 rpm and has an instrumented range to 300 km.
Fire control: Features a Ratep JSC 5P-10E Puma fire control system, consisting of a phased array and target tracking radar along with laser and TV devices. The system, fitted above the bridge deck, features in-flight course correction updates via data links, has a maximum detection range of 60 km, operates autonomously and is capable of automatically locking on to four targets and tracking them.

Sonar 
According to some reports, the APSOH (Advanced Panoramic Sonar Hull) hull-mounted sonar is fitted on the vessels. The APSOH sonar performs active ranging, passive listening, auto tracking of targets and classification. Other reports indicate that the BEL HUMSA (Hull Mounted Sonar Array) sonar is fitted. The HUMSA is a panoramic medium-range active/passive sonar system developed by the Naval Physical and Oceanographic Laboratory (NPOL).  As a stop gap measure, Russian Bronza (MG-345) hull mounted sonars are installed.

Information released from the Severnoye Design Bureau (SDB) indicate that French towed array sonars (TAS) are also fitted. This is very plausible given that many Indian Navy ships now use French TAS, however INS Talwar shows no signs of such a system. The vessel may also have a Russian SSN-137 Variable Depth Sonar (VDS) with NATO reporting name Steer Hide, providing active search with medium frequency, and the sonar might be license produced in India with Indian designation SSSN-113.

Countermeasures 
The frigate features the Russian-made TK-25E-5 integrated electronic warfare suite, which comprises a wideband electronic support measures system that has antenna arrays mounted in the superstructure and a multimode jammer. Four KT-216 decoy launchers, forming part of the PK-10 system, are fitted for soft-kill defence. A total of 120 120mm chaff and infrared decoy rounds are carried on board.

Some ships of the class including INS Tabar have had their TK-25E-5 ESM suites replaced with BEL manufactured Varuna ESM systems with their distinctive circular housing located above the Fregat radar.

Combat data system 
The Trebovaniye-M combat information and control platform is a fully distributed combat management system. It controls all platforms of attack and defence weapons, independently generates combat missions based on situation analysis, determines optimal number of missile firings, displays information on the state of ship-borne weaponry and transmits data to protection systems.
Interconnected via an Ethernet LAN, Trebovaniye-M features eight T-171 full-colour operator workstations (with 18-inch colour flat panel displays) and three central T-162 servers. Individual items of combat system equipment interface to Trebovaniye-M via T-119 and T-190 bus interface units. Raw radar data is received through a T-181 data reception unit.

Recent developments 
India and Russia are negotiating for building four more Talwar frigates for the Indian Navy. In September 2016, it was reported that India would acquire two s from Russia and remaining two will be built in India. The deal was signed in October 2016. These frigates are based on the Talwar class and were to be commissioned into the Russian Navy, but after the Ukrainian Conflict, Ukraine refused to supply any more engines for the Russian ships. So far, only two of the six have been commissioned by Russia. In August 2017, the Indian Defence Acquisition Council (DAC) cleared a proposal of Rs 490 crore to buy two gas turbines from Zorya-Mashproekt in Ukraine for the s being built in Russia.

In October 2018, Indian Ministry of Defense signed a deal for US$950 million for procuring two s, Admiral Butakov and Admiral Istomin. The two frigates will be delivered to Indian Navy by 2022.

A contract was signed between Rosoboronexport and Goa Shipyard for the construction of 2 frigates under license on 20 November 2018. The two frigates will be armed with Brahmos missile system and will include a host of Indian equipment and will be delivered by 2027. The contract for the two ships was awarded to Goa Shipyard Limited by the government of India on 30 January 2019.

The two frigates being built at Goa Shipyard will boasts of a much higher indigenous content and will be named Triput class frigate. The new class of ship will feature BHEL made 76mm gun instead of its Russian counterpart, along with other Indian weapon and sensors.

Ships of the class

See also
 List of active Indian Navy ships
 Future ships of the Indian Navy

References

External links
Talwar Class – Bharat Rakshak
Modified Krivak III Class – Bharat Rakshak
Talwar Class – Global Security
  All Talwar Class Frigates – Complete Ship List

Ships built at the Baltic Shipyard
 
Frigate classes
India–Russia relations